Bugs Bunny's Howl-oween Special is a Looney Tunes Halloween television special directed by David Detiege that first aired on CBS October 26, 1977.

The special includes clips from nine Looney Tunes and Merrie Melodies theatrical shorts originally released between 1948 and 1966, including all four cartoons featuring Witch Hazel as the primary antagonist. Similarly to other Looney Tunes television specials of this era, the clips from classic cartoons are linked together with newly produced animation and redubbed dialogue when necessary.

Plot 
Daffy Duck's nephew encounters Witch Hazel while out trick or treating. Daffy does not believe his nephew, and starts heading to the witch's house to prove him wrong. Bugs Bunny, also trick or treating in the same costume as Daffy's nephew, arrives at Witch Hazel's house. Witch Hazel invites him for tea, but when Bugs reveals himself, he begins to leave. Witch Hazel asks him to stay and have the tea, but Bugs instead brags about his doctor's tea, and leaves to prove to the witch that it has "more pizzazz." The doctor Bugs spoke of is none other than Dr. Jekyll, and Bugs inevitably comes face to face with Mr. Hyde. While Bugs encounters Dr. Jekyll, Sylvester has a dream about his encounter with Tweety after he turns into a Hyde-like monster. Bugs comes across Dr. Jekyll's Hyde formula, believing it to be the doctor's tea. After wondering whether or not it really does have pizzazz, he drinks some of it ("Eh, why not? It's Halloween!") and returns to Witch Hazel as a monster. The witch mistakes Bugs' new form for another costume, and turns him back to normal, causing Bugs to faint.

After attempting to add Bugs to her stew, Witch Hazel chases him all the way to an ancient castle, but is unsuccessful in catching him. Lamenting about her endless working, Witch Hazel makes Speedy Gonzales into her exact double so she can take a vacation, by dipping cheese in her witch's brew after he asked to borrow a cup of cheese. Though not good at being a witch, Speedy stands in for Hazel while Daffy arrives at her house to try to prove his nephew wrong. Speedy makes tea that turns Daffy into the strange creature from Duck Amuck. When Witch Hazel returns, she turns Speedy and Daffy back to normal, and Daffy runs away. Witch Hazel then converts her home into a hotel, when Bugs shows up once more, telling her that he is unimpressed with her spells. The witch decides to put a spell on Sylvester, who is spending the night in the hotel with his owner Porky Pig. Murderous mice and other supernatural hazards are constantly trying to kill Porky, but Sylvester (who cannot talk to Porky) can't convince Porky him of what's going on and is kicked out, running away from the hotel.

Bugs, impressed with Witch Hazel's latest spells, gives her the Hyde formula (which he has grown disgusted of). Upon drinking the formula, the witch transforms into a vampire and proceeds to stalk Bugs while he explores her place. In the meantime, Bugs learns his own magic spells from a book of hers, using them to turn her from a vampire to a bat and back numerous times. After Bugs unwittingly restores Witch Hazel back to her natural form, she declares, "All right, Rabbit, you've spelled your final spell. Now it's my turn!" She chases Bugs into a hallway with no escape, but Bugs finds her emergency supply of magic powder and transforms the witch into a female bunny, whom Bugs sees as a love interest ("Sure, I know, but after all, who wants to be alone on Halloween?"). In an epilogue, the two rabbits celebrate Halloween by drinking the stew from Witch Hazel's cauldron, but Bugs comments that it needs salt and gives the viewers a giant grin with sharp teeth.

Cast 
 Mel Blanc as Bugs Bunny, Daffy Duck, Porky Pig, Sylvester J. Pussycat, Tweety Bird, Speedy Gonzales, Daffy's nephew, and Dr. Jekyll/Mr. Hyde
 June Foray as Witch Hazel & the female bunny
 Bea Benaderet as Witch Hazel & the female bunny (uncredited; Bewitched Bunny clip only)

Credits 
 Classic cartoons directed by Friz Freleng, Chuck Jones, Abe Levitow, Robert McKimson and Maurice Noble.
 Directed by David Detiege.
 Executive producer Hal Geer.

Featured cartoons 
 A-Haunting We Will Go (1966)
 Broom-Stick Bunny (1956)
 Hyde and Hare (1955)
 Hyde and Go Tweet (1960)
 A Witch's Tangled Hare (1959)
 Claws for Alarm (1954)
 Scaredy Cat (1948)
 Transylvania 6-5000 (1963)
 Bewitched Bunny (1954)

Home video
 The special was released on VHS in 1994, and reissued on DVD in 2010 with the 1946 Bugs Bunny short Hair-Raising Hare as a bonus DVD feature. In 2020, it was re-issued on DVD in the Looney Tunes: Holiday Triple Feature collection alongside Bah, Humduck! A Looney Tunes Christmas and Bugs Bunny's Thanksgiving Diet.

References

External links

1977 television specials
1977 in American television
1970s American television specials
1970s American animated films
1977 animated films
Animated television specials
1970s animated television specials
Halloween television specials
CBS original programming
CBS television specials
Looney Tunes television specials
Bugs Bunny films
Daffy Duck films
Porky Pig films
Sylvester the Cat films
Tweety films